INO80 complex subunit E is a protein that in humans is encoded by the INO80E gene.

References

Further reading